Timothy Lane Joiner (born January 7, 1961) is a former professional American football player. He played as a linebacker in the National Football League (NFL) for the Houston Oilers and Denver Broncos. He appeared in 29 games and started in three games in his professional career.

Joiner was born in Monrovia, California, and attended Catholic High School in Baton Rouge, Louisiana. He attended Louisiana State University, where he played college football for the LSU Tigers.

References

Living people
1961 births
People from Monrovia, California
LSU Tigers football players
American football linebackers
Houston Oilers players
Denver Broncos players